Fenpropimorph is a morpholine-derived fungicide used in agriculture, primarily on cereal crops such as wheat. It has been reported to disrupt eukaryotic sterol biosynthesis pathways, notably by inhibiting fungal Δ14 reductases. It has also been reported to inhibit mammalian sterol biosynthesis by affecting lanosterol demethylation. Although used in agriculture for pest management purposes, it has been reported to have a strong adverse effect on sterol biosynthesis in higher-plants by inhibiting the cycloeucalenol-obtusifoliol isomerase. This inhibition was shown to not only alter the lipid composition of the plasma-membrane, but also impact cell division and growth, in plants.

In addition to its effects on fungi, fenpropimorph is also a very high affinity ligand of the mammalian sigma receptor.

References

External links 
 

Fungicides
Morpholines
Tert-butyl compounds